Goodloe Harper Bell (April 7, 1832 – January 17, 1899), born to David and Lucy Bell, was the first teacher at the first Seventh-day Adventist school and co-founder of the Seventh-day Adventist school system. This first school was located on the first floor of the old Review and Herald building in Battle Creek, Michigan. Bell and his family lived on the second floor.

An original portrait of G. H. Bell resides at the Andrews University Museum. It was donated by Dr. Lavan C. and Junette Mapes.

Some of his early students include Edson and Willie White, sons of James and Ellen G. White. Ellen White was a great supporter and influence to G. H. Bell. Others included in the roster of his early students are two notable brothers, William K. Kellogg and John Harvey Kellogg.

Genealogical information
Bell was the eldest of ten children born to David and Lucy Bell née Blodgett.  Bell's sister Florilla and her husband Charles Miller are the great-grandparents of Burt Reynolds.

Textbooks by Bell
 Bell's Language Series - Circa. 1896
 Book 1/Primary Language Lessons
 Book 2/Elementary Grammar
 Book 3/Complete Grammar
 Book 4/Rhetoric, Higher English
 Book 5/Studies in English Lit
 Bible Lessons for the Sabbath School vol. 1 to 8 - Circa. 1887
 Progressive Bible Lessons for Children - Circa. 1872

See also 

 Seventh-day Adventist Church
 History of the Seventh-day Adventist Church
 Andrews University

References

 Allan Lindsay, "Goodloe Harper Bell, pioneer Seventh-day Adventist Christian educator" (1982). Andrews University, EdD thesis (abstract and summary available online)

External links
 Pathways of the Pioneers biography from the Ellen G. White Estate
  Pioneer Stories by The Connecticut Valley Adventist Church
  Andrews University History

Seventh-day Adventist administrators
American educators
1832 births
1899 deaths
American Seventh-day Adventists
Seventh-day Adventist theologians
History of the Seventh-day Adventist Church
Andrews University